Zschöpel is a farming village in the Altenburger Land in Thuringia, Germany. It is part of the municipality Ponitz. The village has a population of 129 people. The first mention was 1140, under the name Tscheppelaw, that is a sorbic foundation.

Villages in Thuringia
Duchy of Saxe-Altenburg
Altenburger Land